Jonathan Daniel Montenegro Uzcátegui (born May 11, 1978 in Caracas) is a well known Venezuelan actor and singer. Montenegro was a member of the popular Puerto Rican boy band Menudo.

Biography
Jonathan Montenegro has been involved in show business since he was a small child, being chosen in 1984 to act in two Radio Caracas Television telenovelas, "El Analisis" and "La Ciudad Muerta" ("Ghost Town"), both of which had been written by the well-known Venezuelan writer and politician, Romulo Gallegos.

In 1985, Montenegro made three theater plays and he debuted in film, making two Venezuelan movies. In addition to that, Montenegro obtained a second place in the prestigious "Festimagico Infantil" ("Magic Children's Festival") talent show, which was held by Venevision.

By 1986, Montenegro would embark in a modeling career, making some television commercials and appearing on some catalogs. He made three telenovelas and one film that year. One of the telenovelas he made that year was "La Intrusa", considered a classic by Latin American critics.

In 1987, Montenegro began exploring his singing abilities, as he was cast on three musicals. He also became active in a national campaign against brain stroke that year.

1988 was a year of firsts for Montenegro, as he debuted on radio with a talk show named "Tren Fantasia" ("Fantasy Train"), and also as a show host, on Radio Caracas Television's "Festival Fantastico Infantil" ("Children's Fantastic Festival"). Montenegro's popularity in Venezuela helped for the directors of Miami's annual "Festival de la Calle 8", a very popular festival among Hispanics, to invite him for the festival's 1989 version.

That same year, Montenegro participated in a television comedy show, a game show, a mini-series and another soap opera. He was also discovered by Edgardo Diaz, who saw the eleven-year-old actor participate alongside Menudo in "Los Ultimos Heroes", a soap opera based on Menudo's latest album, "Los Ultimos Heroes".

In 1990, Montenegro acted alongside Antonio Banderas in a film named Terranova. On December 10 of that year, Montenegro signed with Menudo, becoming the first Venezuelan and first South American member of the band. He joined Mexico's Adrian Olivares, who had previously become the first non-Puerto Rican member of Menudo.

In 1991 Montenegro left the group. He has never mentioned any specific reasons as to why he left, but by the time he did, he had already become a teen idol across Latin America and in Spain, where he toured and had to schedule a special autograph and photo session with his Madrid fans before leaving the European country.

Montenegro spent two years in Venezuela after that, recording four telenovelas. In 1993 he was cast in telenovela Dulce Ilusión. From 1994 to 1995, Montenegro left show business periodically, concentrating on getting his high school diploma and taking English classes in the United States.

Montenegro returned to acting in 1996, by participating in "Sol de Tentacion". He participated in two television shows that year.

By 1997, Montenegro was a full-fledged member of the Venevision roster. He participated in two Venevision soap operas between then and 1998, including "Samantha", where he played a drug addict. That characterization earned him an award as Venezuela's "Best young television actor".

In 1999, Montenegro left acting to become a producer, once again, on radio. He began to produce "Tu Generacion", a radio show geared towards Venezuelan Heavy Metal music fans. The show has remained on the air, but without Montenegro since the early 2000s.

In 2000, Montenegro resumed acting in television series Mis 3 hermanas.

In 2002, Montenegro was in telenovela Juana la virgen.

In 2003, Montenegro was in television series La Cuaima.

In 2005, Montenegro was in television series Dueña y Señora in Puerto Rico.

In 2006, Montenegro was in television series Voltea pa' que te enamores.

Jonathan Montenegro later embarked on a solo singing career, releasing a total of two CD's. Combined with his one CD as a member of Menudo and another with a group of former Menudo members (not El Reencuentro, Montenegro's group is named Menudomania Forever), Montenegro has participated in a total of four CDs. He continues on with his career as a solo singer.

Montenegro married the Venezuelan actress Yelena Maciel in 2011  with the couple having their only child daughter in 2012.  They divorced in 2014.

Filmography

Films

Television

Curiosity 

 Canadian Metal- Symphonic singer  Axelle Doyon is her Fan.

See also
List of Venezuelans

References

External links
official webpage

1978 births
Living people
Menudo (band) members
Venezuelan male telenovela actors
21st-century Venezuelan male singers
20th-century Venezuelan male singers